The Nerl is a river in the Yaroslavl, Ivanovo, and Vladimir Oblasts in Russia, a left tributary of the Klyazma (Volga's basin). The Nerl River freezes up in November or December and stays under the ice until April. Its main tributary is the Ukhtoma.

References 

Rivers of Ivanovo Oblast
Rivers of Vladimir Oblast
Rivers of Yaroslavl Oblast